Pavel Deyev (1 January 1942 – 2 January 2009) was a Soviet equestrian. He competed at the 1964 Summer Olympics and the 1968 Summer Olympics.

References

External links
 

1942 births
2009 deaths
Russian male equestrians
Soviet male equestrians
Olympic equestrians of the Soviet Union
Equestrians at the 1964 Summer Olympics
Equestrians at the 1968 Summer Olympics
People from Rostov